

Narcology, from Russian нарко- (narco-, pertaining to narcotics, illicit drugs) + -логия (-logy, "branch of study") is a subspecialty of psychiatry dealing with the prevention, treatment, diagnosis, social care and recovery of drug-dependent persons. The study and science of phenomena of "narcomania", "toxicomania", chronic alcoholism, and its ætiology, pathogenesis, and clinical aspects. The term for a practitioner of narcology is narcologist. In the United States, the comparable terms are "addiction medicine" and "addictionist".

Narcology was introduced as a separated medical specialty in the Soviet Union during the early 1960s through the 1970s. The term "narcology" is used especially in the countries of the former Soviet Union, including Russia.

Human right violations in Russia 
United Nations bodies and human rights organizations have documented human rights violations against people who use drugs in Russia, including the absolute prohibition on opioid substitution therapy and methadone maintenance treatment, the use of unscientific methods in the treatment of addictive disorders, the absence of drug dependence treatment for people with serious medical conditions.

See also
 Addiction psychiatry
 Addiction medicine

Further literature

References

Sources

Addiction medicine
Addiction psychiatry